Hussein Ali Wahid (born 8 October 1992) is an Iraqi footballer who plays as an attacking midfielder for Al-Najaf FC.

International debut
On 10 October 2014 Hussein Ali Wahid made his International debut against Yemen in a friendly match and scored the equalising 1-1 goal in the 69th minute, on his international debut.

International statistics

Iraq national team goals
Scores and results list Iraq's goal tally first.

Honours

Club
Al-Quwa Al-Jawiya
 Iraq FA Cup: 2015–16

External links

References

1992 births
Living people
Al-Mina'a SC players
Association football midfielders
Iraqi footballers
Iraq international footballers
Al-Shorta SC players